Macrodinychus is the sole genus in the monotypic Macrodinychidae, a family of mites in the order Mesostigmata.

Species
Macrodinychidae contains one genus, with 22 recognized species:

 Genus Macrodinychus Berlese, 1917
 Macrodinychus andrassyi Hirschmann, 1975
 Macrodinychus baloghi Hirschmann, 1975
 Macrodinychus bregetovaae (Hirschmann, 1975)
 Macrodinychus butuae (Hirschmann, 1975)
 Macrodinychus durmei Hirschmann, 1983
 Macrodinychus extremicus sp. nov.
 Macrodinychus hirschmanni (Hiramatsu, 1977)
 Macrodinychus iriomotensis Hiramatsu, 1979
 Macrodinychus kaszabi (Hirschmann, 1975)
 Macrodinychus kurosai Hiramatsu, 1975
 Macrodinychus loksai Hirschmann, 1975
 Macrodinychus mahunkai Hirschmann, 1975
 Macrodinychus malayicus sp. nov.
 Macrodinychus multipennus (Hiramatsu, 1977)
 Macrodinychus multispinosus Sellnick, 1973
 Macrodinychus parallelpipedus (Berlese, 1916)
 Synonym Macrodinychus paraguayensis Hirschmann, 1975
 Macrodinychus sellnicki (Hirschmann & Zirngiebl-Nicol, 1975)
 Macrodinychus shibai Hiramatsu, 1980
 Macrodinychus vietnamensis Hirschmann, 1983
 Macrodinychus yonakuniensis Hiramatsu, 1979
 Macrodinychus yoshidai Hiramatsu, 1979
 Macrodinychus zicsii'' Hirschmann, 1975

References

Macrodinychidae
Acari genera